Magnus Hee Westergaard (born 27 May 1998) is a Danish professional footballer who plays as a midfielder for Danish Superliga club Viborg FF.

Career

Lyngby

Early career
Born in Frederiksberg, Capital Region of Denmark, Westergaard began playing football as a youth for Frederiksberg Boldklub in 2004. In 2011, he moved to the FC Copenhagen School of Excellence where he stayed for three years before joining Lyngby Boldklub at U17 level.

Westergaard graduated through the Lyngby academy, before making his first-team debut as a starter in a 3–0 Danish Superliga defeat to OB on 22 April 2018.

First team
He was permanently promoted to the first team in the summer of 2018 after the club had suffered relegation to the Danish second tier. Westergaard signed a one-and-a-half-year contract extension with Lyngby on 4 January 2019. Six months later, after Lyngby had reached promotion to the Superliga after one season, he signed another contract extension, keeping him at the club until the summer of 2022.

Loan to Hvidovre
On 1 October 2020, Westergaard joined Danish 1st Division club Hvidovre IF on a loan deal for the rest of 2020. On 4 October, he made his debut for the club in a 2–1 away win over Vendsyssel. Later that month, he scored his first goal in a 1–5 home loss to Silkeborg. 

In December 2020, Westergaard extended his loan deal by a further six months. In his season with Hvidovre, Westergaard scored 5 goals in 25 total appearances, including one in the Danish Cup round of 16 against Vejle Boldklub, which saw his club knocked out after a 2–3 loss.

Return to Lyngby
Westergaard returned to Lyngby after his loan deal with Hvidovre expired. In the meantime, Lyngby had suffered relegation to the second-tier. Westergaard immediately appeared in the starting lineup upon his return, in a 2–1 away win over Nykøbing. He was a starter during the 2021–22 campaign, in which Lyngby managed to win promotion back to the Superliga. Westergaard finished the season with 27 total appearances in which he scored four goals.

Viborg FF
On 30 January 2023, Westergaard was sold to Viborg FF, signing a deal until the end of 2025.

Personal life
Westergaard is the son of sailor Stig Westergaard, who participated in the 1992 Summer Olympics in Finn and in the 1996 Summer Olympics in Soling.

Career statistics

References

External links

Living people
1998 births
Sportspeople from Frederiksberg
Association football midfielders
Danish men's footballers
Lyngby Boldklub players
Hvidovre IF players
Viborg FF players
Danish Superliga players
Danish 1st Division players